ARQ is a professional magazine published by the School of Architecture of the Pontifical Catholic University of Chile. It publishes articles on a wide range of architecture-related topics, primarily on issues that are relevant to Chile and South America. Each issue is centered on one theme.

References

External links 
 

Architecture journals
Architecture in Chile
Pontifical Catholic University of Chile academic journals
Publications established in 1980
1980 establishments in Chile